Ghulam Abbas Korejo (Sindhi: عباس ڪوريجو) (born on September 16, 1983), known as Abbas Korejo, is a Sindhi fiction writer, a columnist, and researcher whose columns are published in various Sindhi and English language newspapers and magazines in Pakistan. He has authored five books, two of them award-winning.

Books 
He has written short stories in Sindhi and has also written one research-based book titled Jadeed Kahani Fun & Mozu جديد ڪھاڻي فَن ۽ موضوع.
A few of Abbas Korejo's best known books are:

 Panhinji Dharti پنھنجي ڌرتي ("Our land")
 Chand Peran Heth (چنڊ پيرن ھيٺ)
 Jadeed Kahani: Fun-o-Mozoo ( جديد ڪھاڻي)
 Literature & Extremism ادب ۽ انتھاپسندي
 The Tree وڻ

See also 
 Sindhi literature

References 

Sindhi people

Pakistani novelists

Pakistani male short story writers
Pakistani short story writers
1983 births

Living people